Kaukau may refer to:
Mount Kaukau, also known as Tarikaka, a mountain in Wellington, New Zealand
Kaukau, the Tok Pisin common name of sweet potatoes in Papua New Guinea